Hautala is a Finnish surname. Notable people with the surname include:

Heidi Hautala (born 1955), Finnish politician
Kari Hautala (1973–2016), Finnish basketball player
Kristina Hautala (born 1948), Finnish singer
Rick Hautala (1949–2013), American writer
Tiia Hautala (born 1972), Finnish heptathlete

Finnish-language surnames